Trachysarus is a genus of beetles in the family Carabidae, containing the following species:

 Trachysarus antarcticus Reed, 1874 
 Trachysarus basalis Straneo & Jeannel, 1955 
 Trachysarus bicolor Straneo & Jeannel, 1955 
 Trachysarus emdeni Straneo & Jeannel, 1955 
 Trachysarus kuscheli Straneo & Jeannel, 1955 
 Trachysarus neopallipes Noonan, 1976 
 Trachysarus ovalipennis Straneo & Jeannel, 1955 
 Trachysarus pictipes Straneo, 1958 
 Trachysarus punctiger Andrewes, 1931 
 Trachysarus sericeus Andrewes, 1931

References

Harpalinae